Glyphipterix scintelella is a species of sedge moth in the genus Glyphipterix. It was described by Francis Walker in 1864 and named Glyphiterix scintelella. It is endemic to New Zealand.

References

Moths described in 1864
Glyphipterigidae
Moths of New Zealand